Razah's Ladder is a collaborative studio album by the American hip hop production duo Blue Sky Black Death and the American rapper Hell Razah. It was released by Babygrande Records in 2007.

Production
The album title refers to the Bible story of Jacob's Ladder. Razah said the album "reps me escalating in my career", and would lead-in to his following solo project, titled Heaven Razah. After the recent death of his father, Razah decided to take the album in a deeper, spiritual direction. Blue Sky Black Death said that the album's production was not as dark or as sinister as the production on their previous project with the Wu-Tang affiliate Holocaust, calling it an "uplifting album" with more soulful beats requested by Razah.

Release
Blue Sky Black Death said that there would be no singles released from the album, calling them "obsolete" for underground artists. Instead the entire project was released on vinyl as well as CD.

Track listing

Personnel
Credits adapted from liner notes.
 Hell Razah – vocals
 Blue Sky Black Death – production, arrangement
 MadAdam – turntables (3, 4, 5, 7, 9, 10, 11)
 Evan Gordon – keyboards (2, 4, 8, 10), synthesizer (3, 10), guitar (5)
 Crooked I – vocals (4)
 Shabazz the Disciple – vocals (6)
 Ill Bill – vocals (10)
 Sabac Red – vocals (10)
 Prodigal Sunn – vocals (12)
 Crown Prince Universal – vocals (1, 14)
 Ashley Wise – vocals (14)
 Michael Tabie – design
 Jesse Stone – marketing
 Willy Friedman – marketing
 Ben Dotson – marketing
 Milo Pullman – marketing

References

External links
 

2007 albums
Collaborative albums
Blue Sky Black Death albums
Hell Razah albums
Babygrande Records albums